Dithryca is a genus of the family Tephritidae, better known as fruit flies.

Species
Dithryca guttularis (Meigen, 1826)
Dithryca guttulosa (Loew, 1869)

References

Tephritinae
Tephritidae genera
Diptera of Europe
Taxa named by Camillo Rondani